Premier Parks, LLC (formerly Rapids Holdings, LLC and Premier Attractions Management, LLC) is a limited liability company based in the United States. The company owns and operates several amusement parks and water parks across the country and one in Canada.

History
Kieran Burke and Gary Story previously held the positions of chief executive officer and chief operating officer at Six Flags for more than 10 years. In November 2009, the pair purchased Nashville Shores, consisting of a marina, RV park and water park. They redeveloped the water park for the 2010 season. In early 2011, it was announced the pair had purchased the Ocean Breeze Waterpark in Virginia with plans to renovate it for the 2011 season.

In 2011, the newly founded Premier Attractions Management began operating three properties owned by CNL Lifestyle Properties: Frontier City, SplashTown Houston, and White Water Bay CNL Lifestyle Properties had terminated its lease agreements with PARC Management for eight parks in late 2010. Burke and Story have since gained operational control of additional parks owned by CNL Lifestyle Properties. In 2013, the company changed its name to Premier Parks, LLC taking the former corporate name of the company that had acquired and took the name of Six Flags.

In late 2016, CNL Lifestyle Properties sold their attractions portfolio to EPR Properties. Upon this transaction, EPR transferred management of these parks to Premier Parks, LLC, including ones previously operated by different groups.

In May 2017, operations of Waterworld California were transferred to Six Flags Entertainment Corporation, which had previously owned the park and also own the nearby Six Flags Discovery Kingdom. In May 2018, Six Flags announced that they had entered into a purchase agreement with Premier Parks to acquire the lease rights to operate 5 additional parks: Darien Lake, Frontier City, Wet'n'Wild Phoenix, Wet'n'Wild SplashTown, and White Water Bay.

Properties

Full Ownership
 Island H2O Water Park (2019–present)
 Nashville Shores (2009–present)
 Ocean Breeze Waterpark (2011–present)
 Wet'n'Wild Toronto (2016–present)

Operated for EPR Properties
 City Museum (2019–present)
 Hawaiian Falls Garland (2021–present)
 Hawaiian Falls The Colony (2021–present)
 Magic Springs (2017–present)
 Pacific Park (2018–present) 
 Rapids Water Park (2012–present) 
 Wet'n'Wild Hawaii (2014–present)
 Wild Waves Theme Park (2017–present)

Operated for Kroenke Entertainment
 Elitch Gardens (2013–present)

Former properties 
Full Ownership
Clementon Park (2011-2021); Sold at auction on March 23, 2021 to Indiana Beach Holdings, LLC (now known as IB Parks & Entertainment).
Operated for EPR Properties
 Darien Lake (2015–2018); Operations taken over by Six Flags
 Frontier City (2011–2018); Operations taken over by Six Flags
 Waterworld California (2007–2017); Operations taken over by Six Flags
 Wet'n'Wild Palm Springs (2014–2018) Sold to Pono Acquisition Partners I, LLC and closed until the 2020 season.
 Wet'n'Wild Phoenix (2014–2018); Operations taken over by Six Flags
 Wet'n'Wild SplashTown (2011–2018); Operations taken over by Six Flags
 White Water Bay (2011–2018); Operations taken over by Six Flags

References

 
Amusement park companies
Entertainment companies of the United States
Companies based in Oklahoma City
Entertainment companies established in 2011
2011 establishments in Oklahoma